Laurent Gagnier (born 12 January 1979) is a former French football midfielder.

Gagnier's previous clubs include OGC Nice, Niort, CS Sedan and Amiens SC.

External links

1979 births
Living people
People from Antibes
French footballers
OGC Nice players
Chamois Niortais F.C. players
CS Sedan Ardennes players
Amiens SC players
Association football midfielders
Sportspeople from Alpes-Maritimes
Footballers from Provence-Alpes-Côte d'Azur